Solomon Woodrow Sponaugle (September 24, 1915 – April 30, 1967) was an American football and basketball coach.

Biography
Sponaugle was born on September 24, 1915 in Marshall, West Virginia to William Okey Sponaugle and Emma Warner.

Sponaugle served as the head football coach at Franklin & Marshall College in Lancaster, Pennsylvania.  He held that position for 15 seasons, from 1948 until 1962.  His coaching record at Franklin & Marshall was 59–58–6. He previously taught at a Lancaster County high school.

Sponaugle died on April 30, 1967 in Lancaster, Pennsylvania after a long illness.

References

External links
 

1915 births
1967 deaths
Basketball coaches from West Virginia
Franklin & Marshall Diplomats football coaches
Franklin & Marshall Diplomats men's basketball coaches
People from Jackson County, West Virginia